Andrea Arnaboldi (born 27 December 1987) is an Italian tennis player playing on the ATP Challenger Tour. He advanced to the main draw in the 2014 French Open, 2015 French Open, and 2019 Wimbledon.

Challenger and Itf Futures

Singles: 17 (7-10)

Doubles (8–15)

References

External links
 
 

1987 births
Living people
Tennis players from Milan
Italian male tennis players